Yahoo Arch is located in the Daniel Boone National Forest, in McCreary County, Kentucky.

A hiking trail leads (0.8 Miles) from Yahoo Falls to the arch.

External links 
 USDA Forest Service Arch Info

Landforms of McCreary County, Kentucky
Natural arches of Kentucky
Daniel Boone National Forest